Vanastega is an extinct genus of Triassic temnospondyl amphibian in the family Brachyopidae. It is known from the Cynognathus Assemblage Zone in Burgersdorp, South Africa. The genus contains just one species, Vanastega plurimidens, the type species.

See also

 List of prehistoric amphibians

References

Brachyopids
Anisian life
Triassic amphibians of Africa
Fossil taxa described in 2003
Taxa named by James Kitching